Great White Death is the ninth studio album by power electronics band Whitehouse, released in February 1985. It was the last Whitehouse record to be released through Come Organization, a label which dissolved after the band went on hiatus after the record's release. The album was reissued on CD format in 1991 through the band's new label, Susan Lawly. A special edition was issued in 1997 which came with a bonus track, an extended version of the song "My Cock Is On Fire". In 2010, a vinyl reissue of the album was released through Very Friendly.

Track listing

Personnel
William Bennett - vocals, synthesizers, production, design
Dave Kenny - production
George Peckham - mastering
Denis Blackham - mastering (Special Edition CD)
Alan Gifford - graphic design (Special Edition CD)
Hayley - photography (Special Edition CD)

Release history

References

External links
 

1985 albums
Whitehouse (band) albums